Petra de Boer-Grimbergen (born 4 July 1970) is a former female road and track racing cyclist and speed skater from the Netherlands. She competed in the individual road race at the 1992 Summer Olympics and finished 29th.

Her older sister Jolanda Grimbergen was also a speed skater.

Palmares

1990
 Sprint, Dutch National Track Championships
2nd, Points race, Dutch National Track Championships
5th, Points race, 1990 UCI Track Cycling World Championships
1991
 Points race, Dutch National Track Championships
 Road race, Dutch National Road Race Championships
1992
2nd, Road race, Dutch National Road Race Championships
3rd, Points race, Dutch National Track Championships
3rd, Individual pursuit, Dutch National Track Championships
1993
3rd, Points race, Dutch National Track Championships
3rd, Individual pursuit, Dutch National Track Championships
 Time trial, Dutch National Time Trial Championships

See also
 List of Dutch Olympic cyclists

References

External links
 

Living people
1970 births
Dutch female cyclists
Dutch female speed skaters
Cyclists at the 1992 Summer Olympics
Olympic cyclists of the Netherlands
Dutch track cyclists
Sportspeople from Katwijk
Dutch cycling time trial champions
Cyclists from South Holland